The Barbados Royals (previously known as the Barbados Tridents) are the representative franchise cricket team of Barbados in the Caribbean Premier League. They are one of the six teams specifically created in 2013 for the inaugural season of the tournament. Hollywood actor Mark Wahlberg had an equity interest in the team since 2013 after he was introduced to the game by his friend Ajmal Khan, the club's chairman and CPL architect.

In 2014 CPL they qualified for the champions league. They were out of the tournament in the group stage managing to win only one of their four matches. On 30 July 2021, it was announced that the team name would be changed from the Barbados Tridents to the Barbados Royals.

Barbados Royals as part of the Royals Sports Group, are two-time Caribbean Premier League champions, lifting the trophy in 2014 and 2019. In 2022, Barbados Royals continue its journey in CPL and managed to closed some sponsorship deals like MCW Sports.

Current squad
 Players with international caps are listed in bold.
As of 4 April 2022

Statistics

Overall results 

Last updated: 15 September 2021

 Abandoned matches are counted as NR (no result)
 Win or loss by super over or boundary count are counted as tied.
 Tied+Win - Counted as a win and Tied+Loss - Counted as a loss
NR indicates no result

Source: ESPNcricinfo

Administration and support staff

Seasons

Caribbean Premier League

The 6ixty

See also
 Barbados Royals (WCPL)

References

External links
 
 Barbados on CPLT20.com

Cricket in Barbados
Cricket teams in the West Indies
Caribbean Premier League teams
Cricket clubs established in 2013